is a Japanese football player for Shinagawa CC Yokohama.

Club statistics
Updated to 23 February 2020.

References

External links

Profile at Grulla Morioka
Profile at Machida Zelvia

1992 births
Living people
Kokushikan University alumni
Association football people from Saitama Prefecture
Japanese footballers
J2 League players
J3 League players
FC Machida Zelvia players
Iwate Grulla Morioka players
Association football defenders